Maunula (Finnish), Månsas (Swedish) is a northwestern neighborhood of Helsinki, Finland. For the 1952 Summer Olympics, it hosted part of the road cycling events.

References
1952 Summer Olympics official report. p. 554.

Venues of the 1952 Summer Olympics
Neighbourhoods of Helsinki
Olympic cycling venues